Senegal Premier League is the top division of the Senegal Football Association, it was founded in 1966. The league also hosts a domestic cup, the Coupe de la Ligue. Football clubs from the Senegal Premier League also compete for the Senegal FA Cup.

As of 2011, the league is one main table.

Senegal Premier League Clubs – 2016–17
Casa-Sports FC (Ziguinchor)
AS Douanes (Dakar)
ASC Diaraf (Dakar)
Diambars FC (Saly Portudal)
Génération Foot (Rufisque)
US Gorée (Dakar)
Guédiawaye FC (Dakar)
ASC Linguère (Saint-Louis)
Mbour Petite Côte*
ASC Niarry Tally (Dakar)
ASEC Ndiambour (Louga)
US Ouakam (Dakar)
Stade de Mbour
Teungueth FC

[*] Mbour Petite Côte = merger between Touré Kunda and several clubs in Mbour

Previous winners

1960 : ASC Jeanne d'Arc (Dakar)
1961–63 : unknown champion
1964 : Olympique Thiès
1965 : unknown champion
1966 : Olympique Thiès
1967 : Espoir de Saint-Louis
1968 : Foyer France (Dakar)
1969 : ASC Jeanne d'Arc (Dakar)
1970 : ASC Diaraf (Dakar)
1971 : ASFA Dakar
1972 : ASFA Dakar
1973 : ASC Jeanne d'Arc (Dakar)
1974 : ASFA Dakar
1975 : ASC Diaraf (Dakar)
1976 : ASC Diaraf (Dakar)
1977 : ASC Diaraf (Dakar)
1978 : US Gorée (Dakar)
1979 : AS Police (Dakar)
1980 : SEIB (Diourbel)
1981 : US Gorée (Dakar)
1982 : ASC Diaraf (Dakar)
1983 : SEIB (Diourbel)
1984 : US Gorée (Dakar)
1985 : ASC Jeanne d'Arc (Dakar)
1986 : ASC Jeanne d'Arc (Dakar)
1987 : SEIB (Diourbel)
1988 : ASC Jeanne d'Arc (Dakar)
1988–89 : ASC Diaraf (Dakar)
1990 : UCST Port Autonome (Dakar)
1990–91 : UCST Port Autonome (Dakar)
1991–92 : ASEC Ndiambour (Louga)
1992–93 : AS Douanes (Dakar)
1993–94 : ASEC Ndiambour (Louga)
1995 : ASC Diaraf (Dakar)
1996 : SONACOS (Diourbel)
1997 : AS Douanes (Dakar)
1998 : ASEC Ndiambour (Louga)
1999 : ASC Jeanne d'Arc (Dakar)
2000 : ASC Diaraf (Dakar)
2000–01 : ASC Jeanne d'Arc (Dakar)
2001–02 : ASC Jeanne d'Arc (Dakar)
2002–03 : ASC Jeanne d'Arc (Dakar)
2003–04 : ASC Diaraf (Dakar)
2005 : UCST Port Autonome (Dakar)
2006 : AS Douanes (Dakar)
2006–07 : AS Douanes (Dakar)
2008 : AS Douanes (Dakar)
2009 : ASC Linguère (Saint-Louis)
2010 : ASC Diaraf (Dakar)
2010–11 : US Ouakam (Dakar)
2011–12 : Casa Sports (Ziguinchor)
2013 : Diambars FC (Saly)
2013–14 : AS Pikine (Pikine)
2014–15 : AS Douanes (Dakar)
2015–16 : US Gorée (Dakar)
2016–17 : Génération Foot (Rufisque)
2017–18 : ASC Diaraf (Dakar)
2018–19 : Génération Foot (Rufisque)
2019–20 : Abandoned 
2020–21 : Teungueth FC (Rufisque)
2021–22 : Casa Sports (Ziguinchor)

Total number of wins

Topscorers

References

External links
 Official site
 RSSSF competition history

 
Football leagues in Senegal
Senegal
Sports leagues established in 1966